C. felis may refer to:
 Chlamydophila felis, a bacterium species endemic among house cats worldwide, primarily causing inflammation of feline conjunctiva, rhinitis and respiratory problems
 Ctenocephalides felis, the cat flea,  flea species

See also
 Felis (disambiguation)